Victor Township is a township in Roberts County, in the U.S. state of South Dakota.

History
Victor Township was established in 1892 by Victor Renville, and named for him.

References 

Townships in Roberts County, South Dakota
Townships in South Dakota